Anatoma rapaensis is a species of sea snail, a marine gastropod mollusc in the family Anatomidae.

Description

Distribution
This marine species occurs off the Marquesas Islands and Austral Islands.

References

 Geiger D.L. (2008). New species of scissurellids from the Austral Islands, French Polynesia, and the Indo-Malayan Archipelago (Gastropoda: Vetigastropoda: Scissurellidae, Anatomidae, Larocheidae). The Nautilus 122(4): 185-200
 Geiger D.L. (2012) Monograph of the little slit shells. Volume 1. Introduction, Scissurellidae. pp. 1-728. Volume 2. Anatomidae, Larocheidae, Depressizonidae, Sutilizonidae, Temnocinclidae. pp. 729–1291. Santa Barbara Museum of Natural History Monographs Number 7

External links

Anatomidae
Gastropods described in 2008